Frederick William Sumner (April 12, 1855 – November 20, 1919) was a merchant and political figure in New Brunswick, Canada. He represented Westmorland County in the Legislative Assembly of New Brunswick from 1895 to 1899 as a Conservative member.

He was born in Moncton, New Brunswick and educated in Moncton and Truro, Nova Scotia. Sumner married Margaret T. McEwan. He was a hardware merchant and was also involved in production and export of lumber. Sumner served six terms as mayor of Moncton. He also served as Agent-General for New Brunswick. He ran unsuccessfully for a seat in the House of Commons in 1908.

Two of his former homes in Moncton were designated Local Historic Places.

References 

The Canadian parliamentary companion, 1897 JA Gemmill

External links

1855 births
1919 deaths
Progressive Conservative Party of New Brunswick MLAs
Mayors of Moncton